"American Witch" is the second promotional single off Rob Zombie's third solo album Educated Horses. The song is about the "witch" massacre of the Salem Witchcraft trials in 1692.

The music video of the song features several live performances of the song filmed at Corpus Christi, Denver, Salt Lake City and Mesa. There is also an animated version created by David Hartman. Both of these videos can be found on the bonus DVD included with The Best of Rob Zombie.

It has been featured as part of the soundtrack to EA Sports Big's 2006 football game, NFL Street 3.

Personnel
 Tom Baker - Mastering
 Chris Baseford - Engineer
 Blasko - Bass, Background Vocals
 Tommy Clufetos - Drums, Background Vocals
 Scott Humphrey - Producer
 John 5 - Guitar, Background Vocals
 Will Thompson - Assistant Engineer
 Rob Zombie - Vocals, Lyricist, Producer, Art Direction

Chart positions
Singles - Billboard (North America)

References

Rob Zombie songs
2006 songs
2006 singles
Songs written by Scott Humphrey
Songs written by Rob Zombie
Songs based on American history
Geffen Records singles
Songs written by John 5
Animated music videos